Two warships of Japan have been named Ōi:

 , a  launched in 1920 and sunk in 1944
 , an  launched in 1963 and stricken in 1993

Japanese Navy ship names